Maduve Maduve Maduve is a 1969 Indian Kannada-language film, directed by Geethapriya and produced by Boraiah and Sharadamma Vasanna. The film stars Udaykumar, Jayanthi, B. M. Venkatesh and Poornima. Ranga and Sadhana in supporting roles. The film has musical score by Chellapilla Satyam.

Cast
Udaykumar
Jayanthi
B. M. Venkatesh
Ranga
Poornima
T. N. Balakrishna
Sadhana

Soundtrack
The music was composed by Chellapilla Satyam.

References

1969 films
1960s Kannada-language films
Films scored by Satyam (composer)
Films directed by Geethapriya